Chief Chika Okpala  (born 10 June 1950) is a Nigerian comedian. 
He is popularly known as Chief Zebrudaya a sobriquet he got from his role as Chief Zebrudaya in a TV comedy series, New Masquerade which aired from 1983 to 1993.

Education
He attended Prince Memorial High School at Onitsha, a city in Anambra State, Southeastern Nigeria between 1964 to 1972. 
He later obtained a Bachelor of science (B.Sc) degree from Enugu State University of Science and Technology in 1996.

Filmography
 New Masquerade
 Professor Johnbull

References

Living people
1950 births
Nigerian male comedians
Igbo male actors
Place of birth missing (living people)
Enugu State University of Science and Technology alumni
AMVCA Industry Merit Award winners
Nigerian television actors
20th-century Nigerian male actors
21st-century Nigerian male actors
Members of the Order of the Federal Republic